Pseudomennis is a genus of moths in the family Geometridae erected by Herbert Druce in 1885.

Species
Pseudomennis bipennis (Walker, 1854)
Pseudomennis coccinea Druce, 1885
Pseudomennis dioptoides (Warren, 1905)

References

Geometridae